Luca De Maria (born 18 June 1989) is an Italian rower.

References 
 

1989 births
Living people
Italian male rowers
Rowers from Naples
World Rowing Championships medalists for Italy